Rooty Creek is a stream in the U.S. state of Georgia. It empties into Lake Sinclair.

Rooty Creek was so named on account of the many roots growing over its riverbanks.

References

Rivers of Georgia (U.S. state)
Rivers of Putnam County, Georgia